Martell Covington is an American politician serving as a Democratic member in the Pennsylvania House of Representatives, representing the 24th district in Allegheny County. He won a 2022 special election to succeed Ed Gainey, who was elected Mayor of Pittsburgh in 2021.

Early life and education
Covington is from Homewood, a neighborhood of Pittsburgh. For more than 12 years, he worked in various roles for the Community Empowerment Association, a social service organization on the east side of Pittsburgh, eventually becoming the Assistant Director of Youth & Family Services. He is currently chair of its board of directors. Covington served as a legislative aide to state Senate Democratic Leader Jay Costa, where he worked on critical developments for the Pittsburgh region, including serving as a leadership team member for the Oakland Business Improvement District’s Strategic Plan and a technical advisor for the Oakland Plan. In 2021, he was elected to serve as Vice President for the Young Democrats of Allegheny County. Covington also is part of the Black Equity Coalition's Policy Team. He graduated from Central Catholic High School in Pittsburgh and Howard University.

Pennsylvania House of Representatives
Covington worked as an aide to Jay Costa, a member of the Pennsylvania Senate. He was sworn in on April 26, 2022. He lost renomination to La'Tasha Mayes in the Democratic primary on May 17, 2022.

Electoral history

References

External links

21st-century African-American politicians
21st-century American politicians
African-American people in Pennsylvania politics
African-American state legislators in Pennsylvania
Living people
Politicians from Pittsburgh
Howard University alumni
Democratic Party members of the Pennsylvania House of Representatives
Year of birth missing (living people)
Central Catholic High School (Pittsburgh) alumni